The AMX index, derived from Amsterdam Midkap Index, also known as Midkap index or simply Midkap, is a stock market index composed of Dutch companies that trade on Euronext Amsterdam, formerly known as the Amsterdam Stock Exchange. The index was started in 1995. It is composed of the 25 funds that trade on the exchange and that rank 26-50 in size. The funds that rank 1-25 in size are represented in the AEX index.

Composition
As of June 2021 the AMX index has the following composition.

See also
 AEX index, market index of 25 largest caps on Euronext Amsterdam.
 AScX index, market index of 25 small caps on Euronext Amsterdam.

Reference

External links
 Bloomberg page for AMX:IND

Dutch stock market indices
Euronext indices